Ciliolarina is a genus of fungi within the Hyaloscyphaceae family. The genus contains 6 species.

References

External links
Ciliolarina at Index Fungorum

Hyaloscyphaceae